The 1989 Australian Production Car Championship was a CAMS sanctioned national motor racing title for drivers of Production Cars complying with Group 3E regulations. These regulations were formulated by CAMS to facilitate the racing in Australia of mass-produced motor vehicles with minimal modifications.
The championship was contested over an eight round series with one race per round. 
 Round 1, Symmons Plains, Tasmania, 12 March
 Round 2, Lakeside, Queensland, 16 April
 Round 3, Mallala, South Australia, 30 April
 Round 4, Sandown, Victoria, 21 May
 Round 5, Winton, Victoria, 4 June
 Round 6, Oran Park, New South Wales, 9 July
 Round 7, Amaroo Park, New South Wales, 6 August
 Round 8, Oran Park, New South Wales, 20 August
Championship points were awarded on a 20-15-12-10-8-6-4-3-2-1 basis to the first ten finishers in each round. Only the best seven round results were retained in determining each driver's points total.

Results

Notes

References

Further reading
 Australian Motor Racing Year, 1989/90, pages 185-203
 Australian Touring Car Racing Annual 2, 1990, pages 76–92

External links
 Australian Titles Retrieved on 15 October 2008

Australian Production Car Championship
Production Car Championship